The 2014–15 season was Stevenage F.C.'s first season back in League Two following relegation last season. This article shows statistics of the club's players in the season, and also lists of all matches that the club have played in the season.

Match details

Pre-season

League Two

League table

Matches
The fixtures for the 2014–15 season were announced on 18 June 2014 at 9am.

League Two play-offs

FA Cup

League Cup

The draw for the first round was made on 17 June 2014 at 10am. Stevenage were drawn at home to Watford.

Football League Trophy

Squad statistics

Transfers

In

Out

Loans in

Loans out

References

External links
 Stevenage F.C. Official Website

Stevenage
Stevenage F.C. seasons